The Powrachute Pegasus is an American powered parachute, designed and produced by Powrachute of Middleville, Michigan. The aircraft is supplied as a complete ready-to-fly-aircraft or as a kit for amateur construction.

Design and development
The Pegasus was originally introduced in 2000 and was initially just called the Powrachute as the company's first and only model at that time. As other aircraft were added to the line it was renamed the PC 2000 and later stretched slightly and renamed the Pegasus.

The aircraft was designed to comply with the US FAR 103 Ultralight Vehicles rules as a two-seat trainer and is now a light-sport aircraft. It features a parachute-style high-wing of either  or optionally , two-seats-in-tandem accommodation, tricycle landing gear and a single  Rotax 582 engine in pusher configuration. The  Hirth 2706 engine was a factory option at one time.

The aircraft carriage is built from large-diameter, thin-walled, bolted tubing and includes occupant roll-over protection. In flight steering is accomplished via foot pedals that actuate the canopy brakes, creating roll and yaw. On the ground the aircraft has tiller-controlled nosewheel steering. The main landing gear incorporates spring strut suspension. The aircraft is factory supplied in the form of an assembly kit that requires 30 hours to complete.

Operational history
A total of 360 examples had been flown by February 2005.

Variants
PC 2000
Two seat model.
Pegasus
Stretched two seat model.
Pegasus 912
Variant fitted with a  Rotax 912 S engine

Specifications (Pegasus)

References

External links

2000s United States ultralight aircraft
Single-engined pusher aircraft
Powered parachutes